Arifović is a Slavic surname. Notable people with the surname include:

Ensar Arifović (born 1980), Bosnian football striker 
Ibrahim Arifović (born 1990), Serbian football player of Bosniak origin

Serbian surnames